Gautier Bello (born April 9, 1983 in Garoua) is a Cameroonian footballer.

Club career
Bello began his football career Cotonsport Garoua, and played an important role in the club's 2004 domestic-double-winning squad, making important saves in the Cameroon Cup final. He left Cotonsport in January 2008 and moved to Equatorial Guinea club Renacimiento FC. After two season in the Equatoguinean Premier League left Renacimiento FC and returned to Cameroon who signed with US Douala.

See also
Football in Cameroon
List of football clubs in Cameroon

References

1983 births
Living people
Cameroonian footballers
Cameroonian expatriate footballers
Coton Sport FC de Garoua players
Renacimiento FC players
Union Douala players
Association football goalkeepers
Expatriate footballers in Equatorial Guinea
Cameroonian expatriate sportspeople in Equatorial Guinea